Douglas Moffat (31 July 1843 – 27 March 1922) was an English first-class cricketer active 1863–64 who played for Middlesex and Marylebone Cricket Club (MCC). He was born in Cawnpore and died in Notting Hill. He played in two first-class matches.

References

1843 births
1922 deaths
English cricketers
Middlesex cricketers
Marylebone Cricket Club cricketers